Robeisy Eloy Ramírez Carrazana (born 20 December 1993) is a Cuban professional boxer. As an amateur, Ramírez won gold medals at the 2012 and 2016 Olympics as a flyweight and bantamweight respectively.

Amateur career

Summer Olympic results
London 2012
Round of 32: Defeated Katsuaki Susa (Japan) 19–7
Round of 16: Defeated Chatchai-decha Butdee (Thailand) 22–10
Quarter-finals: Defeated Andrew Selby (Great Britain) 16–11
Semi-finals: Defeated Michael Conlan (Republic of Ireland) 20–10
Final: Defeated Tugstsogt Nyambayar (Mongolia) 17–14

Rio 2016
Round of 32: Defeated Shiva Thapa (India) 3–0
Round of 16: Defeated Mohamed Hamout (Morocco) 2–1
Quarter-finals: Defeated Zhang Jiawei (China) 3–0
Semi-finals: Defeated Murodjon Akhmadaliev (Uzbekistan) 3–0
Final: Defeated Shakur Stevenson (USA) 2–1

Summer Youth Olympics result
Singapore 2010
Preliminaries: Defeated Stan Nicette (Seychelles) 17–3
Semi-finals: Defeated Dawid Michelus (Poland) 3–1
Final: Shiva Thapa (India) 5–2

Pan American Games result
Guadalajara 2011
Quarter-finals: Defeated John Franklin (USA) RSC 3
Semi-finals: Defeated Braulio Ávila (Mexico) 20–7
Final: Defeated Dagoberto Aguero (Dominican Republic) 24–10

Defection
In July 2018, Ramírez left a Cuban National Team training camp in Aguascalientes, Mexico. The Cuban National Sports Institute stated on its official website that Ramírez was "turning his back" on the team and that "Attitudes like this are far from our values and the discipline that characterises our sport". It was thought that Ramírez had defected from Cuba to become professional, following the likes of Guillermo Rigondeaux, Luiz Ortiz, Yuriorkis Gamboa and Erislandy Lara who had also defected from Cuba to become professional.

Professional career

Early career
On 24 May 2019, Ramírez signed a contract to fight professionally with Top Rank. His promoter Bob Arum stated "The last two-time gold medalist that we signed out of the amateurs, Vasyl Lomachenko, has become a big star. We anticipate the same from Robeisy".

On 10 August 2019, he made his professional debut against the little-known American, Adan Gonzales. Ramírez suffered a shock split decision defeat in which he was knocked down by a left hook within the first minute of the opening round. His second professional fight was against Fernando Ibarra De Anda on 9 November 2019. Ramírez dominated his opponent throughout the bout and in the final round, Ramírez landed a body shot which forced Ibarra to take a knee in a neutral corner. This prompted the referee, Gerard White to end the bout immediately.

On 21 February 2020, Ramírez fought against Rafael Morales. Ramírez dominated throughout the bout and secured victory via fourth round knockout. On 9 June 2020, Ramírez defeated Yeuri Andujar via knockout in the first round. Ramírez knocked his opponent down with a left uppercut in the opening moments of the bout. Andujar managed to recover from the knockdown, however Ramírez swiftly hit his opponent with another left hand which put Andujar on the canvas for a second time in the bout. This caused referee Tony Weeks to end the bout instantly.

On 2 July 2020, Ramírez looked to avenge his only defeat as a professional when he fought against Adan Gonzales for a second time. Ramírez controlled the bout from the outset, and secured a dominant victory after winning every round on each of the three scorecards. On 19 September 2020, Ramírez faced Felix Caraballo. Ramírez won via wide unanimous decision after outboxing his opponent throughout the duration of the bout. Ramírez fought against Brandon Valdes in what would be his fifth bout in less than a year on 12 December 2020. Ramírez secured victory in the sixth round after trapping his opponent against the ropes and unloading a barrage of unanswered punches which forced the referee to end the bout.

Ramírez faced Ryan Lee Allen on the undercard of José Ramírez vs. Josh Taylor on 22 May 2021. In the second round, Ramírez landed a straight left hand which put his opponent on the canvas. Despite Allen recovering from the knockdown, Ramírez proceeded to control the remainder of the bout and won via unanimous decision. On 9 October 2021, Ramírez fought on the undercard of Tyson Fury vs. Deontay Wilder III, in a bout against Orlando Gonzalez Ruiz. Ramírez won via unanimous decision after hurting his opponent on multiple occasions during the fight.

Ramírez fought against Eric Donovan on the undercard of Josh Taylor vs. Jack Catterall on 26 February 2022. In the opening round, Ramírez knocked his opponent down after landing a left hand. During the second round, Donovan suffered a cut over his right eye after Ramírez landed a left uppercut. Ramírez started pressuring his opponent in the third round and eventually hit Donovan with a hard left hook which put him against the ropes. Ramírez immediately followed this up with another left hand which knocked Donovan down for a second time. Following the second knockdown, the referee called an end to the bout immediately. On 18 June 2022, Ramírez faced Abraham Nova. In the opening moments of the third round, Nova landed a right hand which knocked Ramírez off balance. Towards the end of the third round, Ramírez hurt his opponent after landing two heavy left hands. In the fifth round, Ramírez landed a powerful straight left hand to the head of Nova which sent him to the canvas. Ramírez was declared the winner by knockout after the referee promptly ended the bout following the knockdown.

Ramírez was booked to face the former WBO junior-featherweight champion Isaac Dogboe on 1 April 2023, in the headliner of an ESPN+ broadcast event, which took place in Tulsa, Oklahoma. Although it was initially scheduled as an interim title bout, the fight was upgraded to a vacant championship bout on February 9, 2023, after the reigning WBO featherweight champion Emanuel Navarrete vacated the belt in order to compete at super featherweight.

Professional boxing record

See also
List of Olympic medalists in boxing
List of Youth Olympic Games gold medalists who won Olympic gold medals

References

External links

London 2012 Olympics Profile

1993 births
Living people
People from Cienfuegos
Boxers at the 2011 Pan American Games
Flyweight boxers
Boxers at the 2012 Summer Olympics
Boxers at the 2016 Summer Olympics
Olympic boxers of Cuba
Olympic gold medalists for Cuba
Olympic medalists in boxing
Medalists at the 2012 Summer Olympics
Medalists at the 2016 Summer Olympics
Cuban male boxers
Boxers at the 2010 Summer Youth Olympics
Pan American Games gold medalists for Cuba
Pan American Games medalists in boxing
Central American and Caribbean Games gold medalists for Cuba
Competitors at the 2014 Central American and Caribbean Games
Youth Olympic gold medalists for Cuba
Central American and Caribbean Games medalists in boxing
Medalists at the 2011 Pan American Games